The 2013 ATP Roller Open was a professional tennis tournament played on hard courts. It was the second edition of the tournament which was part of the 2013 ATP Challenger Tour. It took place in Pétange, Luxembourg between 9 and 15 September 2013.

Singles main-draw entrants

Seeds

 1 Rankings are as of August 26, 2013.

Other entrants
The following players received wildcards into the singles main draw:
  Stéphane Bohli
  Gilles Kremer
  Ugo Nastasi
  Joe Hatto

The following players got into the singles main draw as an alternate:
  Robin Kern

The following players received entry from the qualifying draw:
  Filip Veger
  Alexandre Sidorenko
  Sam Barry
  Constant Lestienne

Champions

Singles

 Tobias Kamke def.  Paul-Henri Mathieu, 1–6, 6–3, 7–5

Doubles

 Ken Skupski /  Neal Skupski def.  Benjamin Becker /  Tobias Kamke, 6–3, 6–7(5–7), [10–7]

References
Official Website

ATP Roller Open
ATP Roller Open
2013 in Luxembourgian tennis